Don Bernardino Fernández de Velasco-Pacheco y Benavides, 14th Duke of Frías, Grandee of Spain, KOGF (1783 in Madrid – 1851) was a Spanish noble, politician, diplomat and writer who served in 1838 as Prime Minister of Spain. He was one of the most important Spanish nobles of his time, and held, among other titles, the dukedoms of Frías, Escalona and Uceda, the Marquisates of Villena and Berlanga, and the Countships of Alba de Liste, Oropesa and Peñaranda de Bracamonte.

Ancestry

|-

|-

1753 births
1851 deaths
Counts of Alba de Liste
Counts of Spain
114
114
109
Bernardino 14
Foreign ministers of Spain
Grandees of Spain
Knights of the Golden Fleece of Spain
Lords of Spain
Marquesses of Spain
Members of the Royal Spanish Academy
Moderate Party (Spain) politicians
19th-century Spanish politicians
Prime Ministers of Spain
Ambassadors of Spain to the United Kingdom of Great Britain and Ireland

19th-century Spanish nobility